The 1973–74 Chicago Black Hawks season was the Hawks' 48th season in the NHL, and the club was coming off their fourth consecutive first-place finish in 1972–73, as they finished on top of the West Division with a 42–27–9 record, earning 93 points.  The Black Hawks defeated the Los Angeles Kings in the NHL quarter-finals, but lost to the Boston Bruins in the semi-finals.

Chicago started the season slowly, as they had a 2–4–4 record in their first ten games; however, the club then went on a nine-game unbeaten streak to push themselves over the .500 mark.  The Hawks battled with the Philadelphia Flyers all season long for the top spot in the West Division, as Chicago finished with a record of 41–14–23, earning 105 points, which was their third-highest total in club history.  It was not enough though, as the Flyers dethroned the Black Hawks for top spot in the West, as they finished with 112 points thus ending Chicago's streak of four consecutive division titles.  The 14 losses by Chicago was the fewest by the team in one season, while the 23 ties they recorded was a new team record.

Offensively, the Black Hawks were led by Stan Mikita, who had a club-high 50 assists and 80 points, while Jim Pappin led the team in goals for the second consecutive season, as he scored 32 goals, and finished with 73 points.  Pit Martin scored 30 goals and 77 points, while Dennis Hull had 29 goals and 68 points.  On defense, Dick Redmond emerged as the offensive leader, scoring 17 goals and 59 points, while Bill White recorded 36 points, while having a team-high +51 rating.  Phil Russell had 10 goals and 35 points, while having a team-high 184 penalty minutes.

In goal, Tony Esposito led the club with 34 victories and a 2.04 GAA, along with ten shutouts while appearing in 70 games.  Rookie goaltender Mike Veisor backed up Esposito, going 7–0–2 with a 2.23 GAA in 10 games.  Chicago tied the Philadelphia Flyers with the fewest goals against in the league at 164, as Tony Esposito and the Flyers Bernie Parent shared the Vezina Trophy for their achievements.

The Hawks opened the playoffs against the Los Angeles Kings, who had a record of 33–33–12, earning 78 points, while placing third in the West Division.  The series opened with two games at Chicago Stadium, and the Black Hawks used their home ice to their advantage, defeating the Kings 3–1 and 4–1 to take a 2–0 series lead.  The series shifted to The Forum in Los Angeles for the next two games, and the Hawks continued to shut down the Kings in the third game, shutting them out 1–0.  Los Angeles avoided the sweep by easily handling the Black Hawks 5–1 to send the series back to Chicago. In the fifth game, the Hawks, led by Tony Esposito, shut out Los Angeles by a score of 1–0 to eliminate the Kings from the playoffs.

Chicago's next opponent was the Boston Bruins, who had finished the season with a 52–17–9 record, earning 113 points, and a first-place finish in the East Division. The Bruins swept the Toronto Maple Leafs in the first round.  The series opened up with two games at the Boston Garden, but it was Chicago who struck first, doubling the Bruins 4–2 in the series opener.  Boston responded in the second game, winning 8–6 to even the series.  The next two games were played in Chicago, and the Black Hawks re-took the series lead, defeating Boston 4–3 in overtime; however, the Bruins rebounded, winning the fourth game 5–2 to even the series again. The fifth game was back in Boston, and the Bruins took their first series lead, dominating Chicago by a score of 6–2.  Boston clinched the series in the sixth game, winning 4–2 on Chicago ice to eliminate the Black Hawks from the post-season.

Season standings

Game log

Regular season

Chicago Black Hawks 4, Los Angeles Kings 1

Boston Bruins 4, Chicago Black Hawks 2

Season stats

Scoring leaders

Goaltending

Playoff stats

Scoring leaders

Goaltending

Draft picks
Chicago's draft picks at the 1973 NHL Amateur Draft held at the Mount Royal Hotel in Montreal, Quebec.

References

Sources
Hockey-Reference
Rauzulu's Street
Goalies Archive
HockeyDB
National Hockey League Guide & Record Book 2007

Chicago Blackhawks seasons
Chicago
Chicago